Major-General Cedric Rhys Price CB, CBE (1905–1987) was a British Army officer who served as Director of Military Intelligence.

Military career
Educated at Selborne College in South Africa and the Royal Military Academy, Woolwich, Rhys Price was commissioned into the Royal Engineers in 1925. He served in the Second World War as an officer in the 56th (London) Division and then as assistant military secretary in the War Office.
 
After the War he became Chief of Staff to the Chairman of the British Joint Services Mission in Washington, D.C. in 1952, Brigadier on the General Staff at Eastern Command in February 1955 and Director of Military Intelligence in June 1956 before retiring in August 1959.
 
After leaving the Army he joined the staff of the Secretary of State for Commonwealth Relations. He was appointed a Commander of the Order of the British Empire in the 1945 Birthday Honours and a Companion of the Order of the Bath in the 1951 New Year Honours.

References

1905 births
1987 deaths
War Office personnel in World War II
Graduates of the Royal Military Academy, Woolwich
Alumni of Selborne College
British Army personnel of World War II
British Army generals
Companions of the Order of the Bath
Commanders of the Order of the British Empire
Royal Engineers officers
British expatriates in South Africa